Major General Ralph Wise Zwicker, USA, (April 17, 1903 – August 9, 1991) was a highly decorated American Army officer who came to public attention during Senator Joseph McCarthy's investigation in 1954.

Biography

Zwicker was born on April 17, 1903, in Stoughton, Wisconsin. He was the first Eagle Scout in the state and graduated from high school in Madison, Wisconsin. After high school he attended the University of Wisconsin-Madison before being recommended for the United States Military Academy at West Point. He graduated in 1927. His brother, Michael, also served in the Army as a colonel. He married Dorothy Harriet Stewart on July 14, 1927, exactly one month after graduating West Point, and had three children. Zwicker died on August 9, 1991, at Fort Belvoir. He is buried with his wife Dorothy (1904–1985) and beside his brother Michael at Arlington National Cemetery, in Section 2.

Career
Zwicker graduated from the United States Military Academy in 1927 and was assigned to Fort Snelling. In 1934, he became an instructor at the United States Military Academy. Later he was assigned to Fort Douglas, Camp Bullis, and Fort Sam Houston. In 1941, he became an instructor at the United States Army Infantry School.

During World War II, Lt. Colonel Zwicker participated in the Normandy landings on D-Day  with the 29th Infantry Division. Going ashore pre-first wave with roughly 100 soldiers as Forward Observer / Beachmaster in the Easy Red Sector of Omaha Beach, sending back intelligence on enemy troop movements, placement of enemy artillery et cetera to the Commanding General Headquarters V Corp. For his actions on D-Day he was awarded the Bronze Star with arrowhead, Silver Star, Distinguished Service Order from Great Britain and was promoted to full colonel soon thereafter.

Due to fortunate circumstances, Colonel Zwicker took command of the 38th Infantry Regiment on July 5, 1944. Less than one week later on July 11, 1944, Major General Walter M. Robertson commander of the 2nd Infantry Division gave the order to take Hill 192. Hill 192 was a major German defensive stronghold that was covered with ancient hedgerows and thick old-growth tree clusters. Taking Hill 192 took the full force and might of the 2nd Infantry Division along with 9 battalions of artillery using a tactic called "Moving Barrage". During the day, roughly 25,000 rounds of artillery, consisting of 50% H.E. and 50% W.P, were levied on the hill before it was taken. This was the only time in the European Theatre that a moving barrage was used. Now the gateway was open for the battle of St. Lo and the beginning of what was to be known as "the breakout." For his actions on hill 192 Colonel Zwicker was awarded his second Bronze Star.

During the Battle for Brest, elements of the 38th Infantry Regiment were the first Americans to enter the city. The port of Brest was captured after 39 days of combat on September 19, 1944. Sometime during the battle of Brest, Colonel Zwicker was awarded his third Bronze Star.

On October 11, 1944, Colonel Zwicker was transferred to Headquarters 2nd Inf Division and promoted to the position of chief of staff (G-3) of the 2nd Infantry Division until the end of the war. Out of the 25 Legion of Merits awarded by the 2nd Infantry Division during the war, Colonel Zwicker was awarded two.

Later, he attended the Naval War College and the National War College. In 1952, he became an instructor at the National War College after serving as the commander of the 18th Infantry Regiment Honor Guard in Germany. In March 1953, he was promoted to brigadier general and became commander of Camp Kilmer, New Jersey. He then was sent to Japan in 1954 and was made commander of the Southwestern Command AFFE until it was deactivated in 1956. He was then promoted to major general in May 1956 and took over command of the 24th Infantry Division in Korea. During his command, the 24th Division was deactivated and was replaced with the 1st Cavalry Division which he commanded until late 1958. Returning to the United States, he was made commander of the XX Corps Fort Hayes, Ohio, until he retired in 1960.

When General of the Army Omar Bradley died in April 1981, Ralph W. Zwicker was named one of the honorary pallbearers at his funeral at Arlington National Cemetery.

Among the awards he received were, Army Distinguished Service Medal, Silver Star, 2 Legion of Merit, 3 Bronze Star Medal with 2 oak leaf clusters, Purple Heart, Army Commendation Medal as well as the Distinguished Service Order from the United Kingdom, Croix de Guerre with 3 palms from France, The French Legion of Honor, and was also awarded medals from Czechoslovakia and Russia.

Involvement with the McCarthy investigation, 1954
While Zwicker was in command at Camp Kilmer, New Jersey, one of his subordinate officers, Major Irving Peress, had been ordered to be discharged from the Army because of his failure to answer questions on a loyalty review form. Having learned of this, the Senate investigating subcommittee of Joseph McCarthy subpoenaed Peress to testify on January 30, 1954. Peress refused to answer questions, citing Fifth Amendment protection against self-incrimination. McCarthy thereupon wrote to Secretary of the Army Robert T. Stevens to demand Peress's court martial. Peress, on the same day, requested that his pending discharge be acted upon immediately, and Zwicker, his commanding officer, granted him an honorable discharge.

McCarthy then called Zwicker to appear before the subcommittee on February 18, where on advice from Army counsel he refused to answer some of McCarthy's questions. Zwicker's testimony, as to whether he had known of Peress' refusal to testify before the same committee at the time that Zwicker granted his discharge, was apparently inconsistent. McCarthy retorted that Zwicker's intelligence was that of a "five-year-old child", and that he was "not fit to wear that uniform".

Army Secretary Stevens ordered Zwicker not to return to McCarthy's hearing. This abuse of Zwicker, a distinguished officer and highly decorated battlefield hero of World War II, provoked anger against McCarthy from many quarters, including the Army and President Eisenhower, who shortly thereafter initiated the Army–McCarthy hearings that led to McCarthy's downfall and censure.

In considering the censure resolution, a select committee chaired by Senator Arthur Vivian Watkins evaluated 46 charges in a "bill of particulars", ultimately reducing them to two, the second being his abuse of General Zwicker as a witness. The Zwicker count was subsequently dropped by the full Senate, and replaced by one in response to McCarthy's abuse of the Watkins committee itself.

Medals and decorations
Here is the ribbon bar of Major General Ralph W. Zwicker:

References

1903 births
1991 deaths
People from Stoughton, Wisconsin
Military personnel from Wisconsin
University of Wisconsin–Madison alumni
United States Military Academy alumni
Naval War College alumni
National War College alumni
United States Military Academy faculty
United States Army generals
Recipients of the Distinguished Service Medal (US Army)
Recipients of the Silver Star
Recipients of the Legion of Merit
Companions of the Distinguished Service Order
Chevaliers of the Légion d'honneur
Recipients of the Croix de Guerre 1939–1945 (France)
Recipients of the Czechoslovak War Cross
United States Army personnel of World War II
Burials at Arlington National Cemetery